Teuchezhsky District is an administrative and a municipal district (raion), one of the seven in the Republic of Adygea, Russia. It is located in the west of the republic and borders with the territory of the City of Krasnodar of Krasnodar Krai, Krasnodar Reservoir, and Krasnogvardeysky District in the north, Belorechensky District of Krasnodar Krai in the east and southeast, the territory of the Town of Goryachy Klyuch of Krasnodar Krai in the south, and with Takhtamukaysky District in the west. Its administrative center is the rural locality (an aul) of Ponezhukay. As of the 2010 Census, the total population of the district was 20,643, with the population of Ponezhukay accounting for 16.7% of that number. Birth place of recently (25-May-2022) deceased Major Pavel Pavlovich Reuka of Russian Army.

History
The district was established on February 7, 1929 as Psekupsky District and was renamed Ponezhukaysky in 1938 and Teuchezhsky in 1940. The district was merged into Takhtamukaysky District on December 7, 1956 but was, however, restored shortly thereafter on August 5, 1957.

Administrative and municipal status
Within the framework of administrative divisions, Teuchezhsky District is one of the seven in the Republic of Adygea and has administrative jurisdiction over oneurban-type settlement and twenty-six rural localities. As a municipal division, the district is incorporated as Teuchezhsky Municipal District. The urban-type settlement and one rural locality are incorporated into an urban settlement, while the remaining twenty-five rural localities are incorporated into six rural settlements within the municipal district. The aul of Ponezhukay serves as the administrative center of both the administrative and municipal district.

Municipal composition
Urban settlements
Tlyustenkhablskoye Urban Settlement
urban-type settlement of Tlyustenkhabl
rural localities under jurisdiction of the urban-type settlement:
aul of Tugurgoy

Rural settlements
Assokolayskoye Rural Settlement
Administrative center: aul of Assokolay
other localities of the rural settlement:
selo of Krasnoye
Gabukayskoye Rural Settlement
Administrative center: aul of Gabukay
other localities of the rural settlement:
khutor of Chabanov
khutor of Petrov
khutor of Shevchenko
Dzhidzhikhablskoye Rural Settlement
Administrative center: aul of Dzhidzhikhabl
other localities of the rural settlement:
khutor of Gorodskoy
aul of Kunchukokhabl
aul of Tauykhabl
Pchegatlukayskoye Rural Settlement
Administrative center: aul of Pchegatlukay
other localities of the rural settlement:
settlement of Chetuk
khutor of Kazazov
khutor of Kochkin, Pchegatlukayskoye Rural Settlement
khutor of Krasnensky
Ponezhukayskoye Rural Settlement
Administrative center: aul of Ponezhukay
other localities of the rural settlement:
khutor of Kochkin, Ponezhukayskoye Rural Settlement
khutor of Kolos
aul of Necherezy
aul of Neshukay
aul of Pshikuykhabl
khutor of Shunduk
settlement of Zarya
Vochepshiyskoye Rural Settlement
Administrative center: aul of Vochepshiy
other localities of the rural settlement:
khutor of Novovochepshy

References

Notes

Sources

Districts of Adygea
 
States and territories established in 1929
States and territories disestablished in 1956
States and territories established in 1957